Power connector may refer to:

 AC power plugs and sockets, devices that allow electrically operated equipment to be connected to the primary alternating current (AC) power supply in a building
 NEMA connector, the standard for much of the Americas and Japan for such plugs and sockets
 Industrial power plug
 DC connector, an electrical connector for supplying direct current (DC) power
 Blade connector, commonly found in cars for quick connection of wiring to electrical components
 IEC 60309 (BS 4343), so-called "Commando" plug and socket
 IEC 60320, connectors for power supply cords to electrical appliances
 Molex connector, four-pin hard disk drive (HDD) connectors, also used for powering CD-ROM drives, burners etc.
 Berg connector, smaller four pin floppy disk drive (FDD) connectors, also used by some hard drives, and carrying the same power supplies as the HDD connectors

See also 
 Electrical connector, an electro-mechanical device for joining electrical circuits as an interface using a mechanical assembly
 RF connector, an electrical connector designed to work at radio frequencies in the multi-megahertz range